Cato Schiøtz (born 26 July 1948) is a Norwegian barrister.

He was born in Oslo. He worked as a lecturer at the University of Oslo from 1975 to 1978, and also as a deputy judge in Sør-Gudbrandsdal before being hired in the law firm Schjødt in 1978. He reached partnerhood in 1983. After 40 years, in 2018 he moved on to the law firm Glittertind.

Schiøtz has also been active in the Liberal Party and is a well-known cultural figure in Norway, both as an anthroposophist and a member of the Bibliophile Club.

References

1948 births
Living people
Lawyers from Oslo
University of Oslo alumni
Liberal Party (Norway) politicians
Anthroposophists
Norwegian bibliophiles